is a retired Japanese judoka.

Kamochi is from Warabi, Saitama. He began Sumo at the age of 3rd grader and won the championship consecutively for six years. He also began judo at his junior high school days and when he was a student of Nihon University, he was trained by former world champion, Chonosuke Takagi.

In 1991, he participated in the World Championships held in Barcelona. He also participated Asian Championships in Osaka and won a gold medal at the half-heavyweight category.

Kamochi belonged to JRA after graduation from university in 1992. He retired in 1999 after All-Japan Teams Championships.

Achievements
1989 - All-Japan Junior Championships (-95 kg) 1st
 - All-Japan Selected Championships (-95 kg) 3rd
 - Kodokan Cup (-95 kg) 3rd
1990 : World University Championships (-95 kg) 1st
 - Jigoro Kano Cup (-95 kg) 2nd
 - All-Japan Selected Championships (-95 kg) 3rd
 - All-Japan University Championships (-95 kg) 3rd
1991 - World Championships (-95 kg) 5th
 - Asian Championships (-95 kg) 1st
 - Kodokan Cup (-95 kg) 1st
 - All-Japan Selected Championships (-95 kg) 2nd
 - All-Japan University Championships (-95 kg) 1st
1992 - Jigoro Kano Cup (-95 kg) 2nd
 - All-Japan Selected Championships (-95 kg) 3rd
 - Kodokan Cup (-95 kg) 3rd
1993 - East Asian Games (-95 kg) 2nd
 - All-Japan Selected Championships (-95 kg) 2nd
1994 - Jigoro Kano Cup (-95 kg) 3rd
 - All-Japan Selected Championships (-95 kg) 1st
 - Kodokan Cup (-95 kg) 3rd
 - Kodokan Cup (-95 kg) 1st
1995 - All-Japan Selected Championships (-95 kg) 3rd
 - Kodokan Cup (-95 kg) 3rd
1996 - Jigoro Kano Cup (-95 kg) 2nd
 - All-Japan Championships (Openweight only) 3rd
 - All-Japan Selected Championships (-95 kg) 2nd
 - Kodokan Cup (-95 kg) 3rd
1997 - All-Japan Selected Championships (-95 kg) 3rd

References 

Japanese male judoka
Sportspeople from Saitama Prefecture
1970 births
Living people
Nihon University alumni
20th-century Japanese people